Melba is a 1988 Australian mini series about opera soprano (Dame) Nellie Melba.

Cast

 Linda Cropper as Nellie Melba
 Hugo Weaving as Charles Armstrong
 Peter Carroll as David Mitchell
 Googie Withers as Lady Armstrong
 Joan Greenwood as Madame Marchesi
 Jean-Pierre Aumont as Comte de Paris
 Maria Aitken as Gladys de Grey
 Tom Burlinson as Sid Meredith
 Noel Ferrier as J.C. Williamson
 Nell Schofield as Belle Patterson
 Simon Burke as John McCormack
 Dorothy Alison as Elizabeth Mitchell
 Judi Farr as Amy Davidson
 Helmut Bakaitis as John Lemmone
 Christopher Benjamin as Colonel Otway
 Mel Martin as Mrs. Otway
 Lyndel Rowe as Blanche Marchesi

References

External links
Melba at IMDb

1980s Australian television miniseries
1988 Australian television series debuts
1988 Australian television series endings
1988 television films
1988 films
English-language television shows
Biographical films about musicians
Cultural depictions of Nellie Melba